Anke Molkenthin (born 26 May 1962) is a German adaptive rower and paracanoeist who competes in international level events.

She has competed as a rower in the mixed coxed four in the 2012 Summer Paralympics where she won a silver medal and competed in the 2016 Summer Paralympics as a rower and a paracanoeist but did not medal in both sports.

References

External links
 
 
 
 

1962 births
Living people
Rowers from Berlin
Paralympic rowers of Germany
Paracanoeists of Germany
Rowers at the 2012 Summer Paralympics
Rowers at the 2016 Summer Paralympics
Paracanoeists at the 2016 Summer Paralympics
Medalists at the 2012 Summer Paralympics
21st-century German people